The women's heptathlon event at the 2021 European Athletics U23 Championships was held in Tallinn, Estonia, at Kadriorg Stadium on 8 and 9 July.

Records
Prior to the competition, the records were as follows:

Results

Final standings

References

Heptathlon
Combined events at the European Athletics U23 Championships